A tiling with rectangles is a tiling which uses rectangles as its parts. The domino tilings are tilings with rectangles of  side
ratio.
tilings with polyominoes of shapes such as  fall also into this category.

Congruent rectangles 
Some tiling of rectangles include:

Tilings with non-congruent rectangles 
The smallest square that can be cut into (m × n) rectangles, such that all m and n are different integers, is the 11 × 11 square, and the tiling uses five rectangles.

The smallest rectangle that can be cut into (m × n) rectangles, such that all m and n are different integers, is the 9 × 13 rectangle, and the tiling uses five rectangles.

See also
 Squaring the square
 Tessellation
 Tiling puzzle

Notes

Tessellation